The Lunar dynasty (IAST: Candravaṃśa) is a legendary principal house of the Kshatriyas varna, or warrior–ruling caste mentioned in the ancient Indian texts. This legendary dynasty was said to be descended from moon-related deities (Soma or Lunar). The Hindu deity Krishna is believed to have been born in the Yaduvamsha branch of the Lunar dynasty. 

According to the Shatapatha Brahmana, Pururavas was the son of Budha (himself often described as the son of Soma) and the gender-switching deity Ila (born as the daughter of Manu). Pururavas's great-grandson was Yayati, who had five sons named Yadu, Turvasu, Druhyu, Anu, and Puru. These seem to be the names of five Vedic tribes as described in the Vedas.

According to the Mahabharata, the dynasty's progenitor Ila ruled from Prayaga, and had a son Shashabindu who ruled in the country of Bahli. The son of Ila and Budha was Pururavas who became the first Chandravamsha emperor of the entirety of the earth. Ila's descendants were also known as the Ailas.

Mahabharata 
In Hindu texts, the Kurukshetra War, which forms the subject of the Indian epic Mahabharata, was largely fought between rival branches of the Lunar dynasty, famously resulting in Arjuna's turn away from war and the reprimand of his mentor Krishna. Krishna reminds Arjuna that dharma stands above everything, and the text forms an integral cultural cornerstone for all four Kshatriya houses.

By the conclusion of the Kurukshetra War, most of the Yaduvamsha lineage is in peril. The sinking of Dvārakā sees the destruction of the entire Yaduvamsha lineage, with the exception of Vajra, who was saved by Arjuna, and later becomes the King of Mathura.

See also
 Solar dynasty
 Mahabharata
 History of Hinduism
 Puru and Yadu Dynasties

References

Sources

External links

 
Kshatriya
Mythological peoples
Kingdoms in the Mahabharata